Marie-Ève Dicaire (born July 29, 1986) is a Canadian professional boxer who is a 2-time IBF female light middleweight champion from 2018 to March 2021 and from December 2021 to November 2022. In 2013, she was named athlete of the year by Boxing Quebec. As of September 2020, she is ranked as the world's second best active female light middleweight by The Ring and BoxRec.

Early life 
Dicaire was born on July 29, 1986 in Saint-Eustache, Quebec. At 6 years old, she started learning Karate and before she was 11 years old, she obtained her black belt and won the Canadian Championship.

Martial Arts 
5th Dan Black belt -  Kenpo Karate

Amateur career 
Dicaire has fought more than 50 fights in less than four years as an amateur.

2012 / 2013 -  Quebec Gants Dorés Champion  
2013        -  Canadian Amateur Champion  
2012 / 2013 -  Ring Side World Championship  
2013        -  Athlete par excellence of the Fédération Québécois de Boxe Olympique

Professional boxing career 
Dicaire turned pro in 2015.

On September 14, 2017, it was announced that Dicaire would be fighting on October 25, 2017 against the IBF's 6th-ranked Yamila Esther Reynoso.  The fight took place at Casino du Lac Leamy in the city of Gatineau, Quebec, Canada.  Dicaire won the 10-round bout by unanimous decision.

On October 25, 2017, it was announced that Dicaire would be fighting on Dec 7, 2017 for the NABF 154lbs vacant super welterweight title. The fight would be held at the Montreal Casino.

On December 6, 2017, it was announced that Dicaire's original opponent Silvia Zuniga was not able to obtain her visa to fight in Canada. As a result, Paty Ramirez stepped in and fought Dicaire for a second time.

Dicaire vs. Núñez
On January 19, 2018, it was announced that Dicaire would be fighting against Katia Alvariño for the vacant NABF female 154lbs super welterweight title.  The event was held at the Montreal Casino in Montreal, Canada on February 15, 2018. Her opponent was switched a couple of days before the fight to Marisa Gabriela Núñez from Argentina.  Dicaire defeated Núñez and became the NABF champion in the super welterweight division.

Dicaire vs. Belen Abellaneda

Dicaire participated in the Grand Prix final gala of the Group Yvon Michel (GYM) on June 9, 2018 at the Cabaret du Casino Montreal, where she faced the Argentine Yamila Belen Abellaneda in a fight that was scheduled for 10 rounds.

Abellaneda (6-1-0, 3 KOs) competed for over 10 rounds against the reigning WBO lightweight world champion, the Brazilian Rose Flying on May 6, 2017 in Sao Paulo. The 24-year-old fighter has never been knocked out as much in the amateurs as in the professionals. Dicaire (11-0-0, 0 KOs), ranked second by the WBC and the WBA at super welterweight, as well as third by the IBF at welterweight (147 lbs), picked up her twelfth professional win, keeping her perfect record intact with a ten-round unanimous decision over Abellaneda. The judges' scores were 100-90, 99-91 and 98-92.

Dicaire vs. Ayala II
In the semifinal gala starring Steve Bossé and Jean Pascal, Dicaire defeated Mexican Alejandra Ayala (8-4-0, 5 KOs) by unanimous decision on Friday, June 20, 2018 at the Place Bell de Laval.

It was a rematch between the two women. Dicaire (13-0-0, 0 KOs) defeated Ayala (8-4-0, 5 KOs) for the first time by unanimous decision on June 15, 2017, at the Casino de Montréal. The NABF world super-middleweight champion remained undefeated.

Dicaire vs. Namús
Dicaire fought Uruguayan native Chris Namús for the IBF super welterweight title.  Dicaire (13-0, 0 KOs), 32, appeared in her first world championship fight, while Namús (24-4, 8 KOs), 31, was in her second defense of the title. The duel between Dicaire and Namús took place on December 1, 2018 at the Videotron Center, in the sub-card of the WBC light heavyweight world championship bout between Adonis Stevenson and Oleksandr Gvozdyk. Dicaire defeated Namús by unanimous decision (97-93, 96-94, 97-93) for the IBF world female super welterweight title.

Dicaire vs. Tejada (Fight Cancelled)
Dicaire was supposed to defend her IBF World Female Super Welterweight Title for the first time against Dominican Republic native Lina Tejada. However, the Quebec athletic commission canceled the bout when Tejada's medical exam revealed that she was completely blind in one eye. The bout between Dicaire and Tejada was scheduled to take place March 23, 2019 at the Montreal Casino.

Dicaire vs. Lauren
Dicaire defended her (IBF) super-middleweight title by winning by unanimous decision against Sweden's Mikaela Lauren.  After 10 rounds, Dicaire won the favor of the three judges with scores of 97-93, 98-92, and 99-91.

Dicaire vs. Lindberg
IBF Super Welterweight Champion Dicaire defended her championship for the second time against Sweden’s Maria Lindberg (17-4-2, 9 KOs) on Friday, June 28 at the Montreal Casino, Canada. Lindberg had gone up against then champion Christina_Hammer twice, champion Ewa Piatkowska, Inna Sagaydakovskaya over her nearly 16-year career. Dicaire won against her veteran opponent by unanimous decision (98-92, 99-91 and 99-91).

Dicaire vs. Suarez
The Videotron Centre was the host for Dicaire's (16-0-0, 0KO) defense of her IBF Super Welterweight title for the 3rd time against the experienced Venezuelan Ogleidis Suárez (29-4-1, 13 KOs), the #2 contender for the belt.

Dicaire v Shields
In a battle of undefeateds on March 5, 2021, Claressa Shields defeated Dicaire by unanimous decision (100-90 on all scorecards) to retain her WBC and WBO super welterweight titles, and also claim the IBF 154-pound belt and vacant WBA light middleweight belt. With the win, Shields became the first world champion boxer in the four-belt era to hold undisputed titles in two different weight divisions.[53][54]

Professional boxing record

References

External links 
 
 

1986 births
Living people
Canadian women boxers
People from Saint-Eustache, Quebec
Sportspeople from Quebec
Welterweight boxers
Light-middleweight boxers
Southpaw boxers
International Boxing Federation champions